The Aurus Arsenal is a luxury minivan by Russian automaker Aurus Motors and developed by NAMI in Moscow, Russia.

The Aurus Arsenal is part of the Kortezh series of luxury vehicles, which includes the Senat limousine and the Komendant SUV.

References

External links

 Aurus Motors

Cars introduced in 2018
Minivans
Luxury vehicles
Cars of Russia
All-wheel-drive vehicles
Aurus vehicles